Milan Milojević (Serbian Cyrillic: Mилан Mилојевић ;born 24 April 1989 in Smederevo) is a Serbian football midfielder.

Previously he played for Smederevo (1 match in the Serbian SuperLiga season 2006-07, and 5 matches in the Serbian First League in the season 2008-09) and on loan at Morava Velika Plana in the first half of the 2009-10 season.

References

1989 births
Living people
Sportspeople from Smederevo
Serbian footballers
Serbian expatriate footballers
FK Smederevo players
Serbian SuperLiga players
Association football midfielders